Adrienne Clarkson Presents is a Canadian cultural entertainment series broadcast on CBC Television beginning in 1988. The series ended in 1999, the year host Adrienne Clarkson was appointed Governor General of Canada.

Episodes featured artists such as Molly Johnson, Quartette, and Peppiatt and Aylesworth. The series was preceded by a limited 1988 summer programme, Adrienne Clarkson's Summer Festival.

External links
 
 
TVArchive.ca: Adrienne Clarkson Presents
 Adrienne Clarkson Presents: A Tribute to Peppiatt & Aylesworth: Canada's First Television Comedy Team

1988 Canadian television series debuts
1999 Canadian television series endings
CBC Television original programming
1980s Canadian variety television series
1990s Canadian variety television series